Joshua Charles Scowen (born 28 March 1993) is an English professional footballer who plays as a midfielder for League One club Wycombe Wanderers.

Career

Wycombe Wanderers
Scowen came through Wycombe Wanderers' youth system, making his professional debut on 26 March 2011, in their 3–0 away win over Morecambe in League Two. He came on as substitute for Kevin Betsy in the 89th minute. Wycombe striker, Scott Rendell said; "It's great to see him come out and get his chance because he will be a big player for this club if he carries on doing what he's doing."

In April 2011, he was one of four Wycombe academy scholars to be awarded professional contracts by the club. On 21 October 2011, he signed a three-month loan deal with Hemel Hempstead Town.

Eastbourne Borough (loan)
Scowen joined Eastbourne Borough on a six-month loan deal in August 2012, reuniting him with former Hemel Hempstead manager Tommy Widdrington.

Return to Wycombe
Scowen was immediately recalled by Wycombe following their appointment of Gareth Ainsworth as new manager.
After a strong first half to the 2014–15 season, Scowen attracted the attention of several higher-league clubs, and in January 2015, Scowen left Wycombe to join Barnsley.

Barnsley
On 15 January 2015, Scowen joined League One, Barnsley.

Queens Park Rangers
On 1 July 2017, Scowen joined Championship club, Queens Park Rangers, following his decision to leave Barnsley at the end of his contract.

Sunderland
In January 2020 he joined Sunderland. On 8 September 2020 he scored his first goal for Sunderland in an EFL Trophy tie against Aston Villa U21s. On 25 May 2021 it was announced that he would leave Sunderland at the end of the season, following the expiry of his contract.

Return to Wycombe
On 29 June 2021, Scowen returned to sign for his first professional club Wycombe Wanderers on a two-year contract.

Career statistics

Honours
Barnsley
Football League Trophy: 2015–16
Football League One play-offs: 2016

Sunderland
EFL Trophy: 2020–21

References

External links

1993 births
Living people
People from Cheshunt
English footballers
Association football midfielders
Wycombe Wanderers F.C. players
Hemel Hempstead Town F.C. players
Eastbourne Borough F.C. players
Barnsley F.C. players
Queens Park Rangers F.C. players
Sunderland A.F.C. players
English Football League players
National League (English football) players